Lukas Hasler (born March 15, 1996, in Rottenmann.), is an Austrian concert organist, composer, choir director.

Hasler currently lives in Graz.

Education 

He started off as a piano student, but later developed an interest in the organ. By the age of 14, Hasler was the organist in two parishes and he also led a choir.

Hasler received a broad musical education at Admont Abbey High School. At the age 16, he continued his musical education in organ preparation at the University of Music and Performing Arts in Graz. After graduating from high school, Hasler enrolled as a full-time organ student and graduated with a Bachelor of Arts in 2019 and with a Master of Arts in Organ Music in 2022.

During his time at university, he also participated in several master classes with Jean Guillou, Ton Koopman, Ludger Lohmann and Skip Sempé.

Career 

Hasler performs 30 to 40 concerts a year and also directs the "PaltenKlang-Choir" in his home town. He has over 45,000 followers on social media and his own YouTube channel.

In 2019 Hasler won the "Grand Prix" at the International Organ Competition in Malta.

In the summer of 2019 Hasler released his first solo CD "A Portrait" which features his own improvisations and organ works by Johann Sebastian Bach, Franz Liszt and Marcel Dupré. In 2020 he released the single "From Austria with Love" and in 2021 his new single "Fantasy and Fugue on the Theme B-A-C-H".

Performances 

Lukas Hasler is in international demand. During the span of his music career he has performed at several festivals. Some notable ones include the opening of the Salzburg Festival, the Tyrolean Festival in Erl, the Organ Summer at the St. Florian Bruckner Organ, the International Organ Festival in Düsseldorf and the Russian Music Festival of the Volgograd Philharmonic. He has also performed international concerts in cathedrals and concert halls touring Germany, France, Italy, Great Britain, Russia and the United States.

In 2022, he was the first classical musician to perform in Ukraine after the start of the war and played two benefit concerts in the Lviv Concert Hall for the victims of the war.

Press 
"The Grunion Los Angeles":

Lukas Hasler showed dazzling fingerwork in Max Reger's Toccata and Fugue in D minor, which begins quietly and calmly and builds to a majestic climax. The church's magnificent Aeolian-Skinner organ, in Hasler's gifted hands (and feet), rewarded the audience with a kaleidoscope of beautiful, stirring, inspiring and often magical sounds. [...] There was a nice contrast between the pieces, long and short, celebratory and meditative. Hasler negotiated the thick textures while always keeping the melody prominent, no easy feat.

Awards 

 2012: Winner of the „Prima la Musica“-Prize in Graz (Styria)
 2012: Federal victory „Prima la Musica“ in Fohnsdorf
 2013: Winner of the Styrian Culture Prize
 2014: Winner of the „Prima la Musica“-Prize in Graz (Styria)
 2014: Federal victory „Prima la Musica“ in Wien
 2014: Winner of the „Bärenreiter“-Prize
 2015: Finalist of the composing competition „Jugend komponiert“
 2019: Winner of the „Grand Prix“ at The Malta International Organ Festival
 2020: Elected "Newcomer of the Year" from the daily newspaper Kleine Zeitung

Discography 

 CD participation "Thesaurus Eius" – Les Choeurs de Saint-Georges Lyon (2017)
 First Solo-CD "A Portrait" (2019)
 Release of the single "From Austria with Love" (2020)
Release of the single "Fantasy and Fugue on the Theme B-A-C-H" (2021)

Publication 

 Chancen, Risiken und Ziele des Online-Fundraising am Beispiel von AIMS: Amerikanische Musiker auf der Reise nach Europa. AV Akademikerverlag, .

References

External links

Living people
1996 births
Austrian organists